{{DISPLAYTITLE:C5H11N}}
The molecular formula C5H11N (molar mass: 85.15 g/mol, exact mass: 85.0891 u) may refer to:

 Piperidine (hexahydropyridine)
 Cyclopentylamine (cyclopentanamine)
 1-Methylpyrrolidine
 2-Methylpyrrolidine